The Massachusetts Miracle was a period of economic growth in Massachusetts during most of the 1980s. Before then, the state had been hit hard by deindustrialization and resulting unemployment. During the Miracle, the unemployment rate fell from more than 12% in 1975 to less than 3%, which was accompanied by tax reductions and a drastic increase in personal income.

Initial growth
The growth was heavily centered in financial services and high-tech industry (often driven by technology out of Harvard University and MIT), and  within Boston and in its suburbs along Route 128.  The expansion of the high tech industry along Route 128 has led to the name of the road being used as a nickname for the regional tech economy, much like Silicon Valley.

Notable companies associated with the Miracle include Digital Equipment Corporation, Data General, Wang Laboratories, Prime Computer, Lotus Development Corporation and Apollo Computer.

Michael Dukakis was Governor of Massachusetts during most of this time and attempted to take credit for the "Miracle" during his campaign for United States President in 1988.

The early 1990s recession
In the early 1990s, Massachusetts, like most of the Northeast, was much more severely affected by the early 1990s recession than the country as a whole, with the unemployment rate nearly reaching 9% by the summer of 1992. However, Massachusetts recovered from the recession faster than the rest of the Northeast, helped by the nationwide tech boom of the 1990s, and by the end of the decade the unemployment rate once again fell below 3%.

References 

1980s economic history
1980s in Massachusetts
Economic booms
Economic history of Massachusetts